Esto is a town in Holmes County, Florida, United States. The population was 364 at the 2010 census.

Geography

Esto is located in northeastern Holmes County at  (30.981052, –85.646857). It is bordered to the north by the state of Alabama and to the east by the town of Noma, Florida. Florida State Road 79 is the main road through town, leading south  to Bonifay, the Holmes County seat, and north (as Alabama State Route 167)  to Hartford, Alabama. Florida State Road 2 follows the southern border of Esto, and leads east  to Graceville and west  to State Road 81. Dothan, Alabama,  to the northeast, is the closest city with more than 50,000 people.

Demographics

As of the census of 2000, there were 356 people, 144 households, and 95 families residing in the town. The racial makeup of the town was 92.13% White, 2.25% African American, 3.93% Native American, 0.56% from other races, and 1.12% from two or more races. Hispanic or Latino of any race were 2.81% of the population.

There were 144 households, out of which 30.6% had children under the age of 18 living with them, 50.7% were married couples living together, 9.0% had a female householder with no husband present, and 34.0% were non-families. 31.3% of all households were made up of individuals, and 17.4% had someone living alone who was 65 years of age or older.  The average household size was 2.47 and the average family size was 3.09.

In the town, the population was spread out, with 28.1% under the age of 18, 7.6% from 18 to 24, 23.3% from 25 to 44, 26.4% from 45 to 64, and 14.6% who were 65 years of age or older.  The median age was 37 years. For every 100 females, there were 110.7 males.  For every 100 females age 18 and over, there were 100.0 males.

The median income for a household in the town was $31,667, and the median income for a family was $36,563. Males had a median income of $30,313 versus $15,625 for females. The per capita income for the town was $12,961.  About 15.7% of families and 12.5% of the population were below the poverty line, including 16.8% of those under age 18 and none of those age 65 or over.

References

Towns in Holmes County, Florida
Towns in Florida